Thomas Odell may refer to:

Tom Odell (born 1990), British singer-songwriter
Thomas Odell (writer) (1691–1749), English playwright